Tayna Lawrence (born 17 September 1975 in Spanish Town, Jamaica) is a Track and field sprint athlete, competing internationally for Jamaica. She is an Olympic gold medalist in the 4 x 100 meter relay race.

Lawrence graduated from Florida International University, in Miami, Florida, USA. She sustained a leg injury and had to undergo surgery in 2003, missing the World Championships in Paris. She was severely hampered by a series of stress fractures in 2001, which ruled her out of the World Championships.

Personal bests

* Marion Jones, the American athlete who finished in first place, was stripped of her gold medal in October 2007 following a doping scandal. Ekaterini Thanou, the Greek athlete who finished second place, was later suspended for two years following various scandals at the 2004 Summer Olympics.

Videos
 Flotrack Videos of Tayna Lawrence

References

 
 

1975 births
Living people
People from Spanish Town
Athletes (track and field) at the 2000 Summer Olympics
Athletes (track and field) at the 2004 Summer Olympics
Florida International University alumni
Jamaican female sprinters
Olympic athletes of Jamaica
Olympic gold medalists for Jamaica
Olympic silver medalists for Jamaica
Medalists at the 2004 Summer Olympics
Medalists at the 2000 Summer Olympics
Olympic gold medalists in athletics (track and field)
Olympic silver medalists in athletics (track and field)
Central American and Caribbean Games medalists in athletics
Olympic female sprinters
20th-century Jamaican women
21st-century Jamaican women